Deroca inconclusa is a moth in the family Drepanidae. It was described by Francis Walker in 1856. It is found in northern India, Myanmar, China (Sichuan, Yunnan, Shensi) and Japan.

The wingspan is 25–35 mm. Adults are white, the wings nearly hyaline (glass like) with two incomplete pale greyish bands. One marginal and the other submarginal. The forewings have three pale greyish spots along the costa and one at the tip of the discal areolet.

Subspecies
Deroca inconclusa inconclusa (northern India, Myanmar, China: Sichuan, Yunnan)
Deroca inconclusa carinata Watson, 1957 (China: Shensi)
Deroca inconclusa phasma Butler, 1878 (Japan)

References

Moths described in 1856
Drepaninae